The flag of Liberia or the Liberian flag, sometimes called the Lone Star, bears a close resemblance to the flag of the United States, representing Liberia's founding by former black slaves from the United States and the Caribbean. They are both a part of the stars and stripes flag family.

The Liberian flag has similar red and white stripes, as well as a blue square with a white star in the canton. It was adopted on 24 August 1847.

History
The flag of Liberia was designed and hand-stitched by a committee of seven women. The chair of the committee was Susannah Elizabeth Lewis. The other members of the committee were Matilda Newport, Rachel Johnson, Mary Hunter, Mrs. J. B. Russwurm, Colonette Teage Ellis, and Sara Draper. All of the women were born in the United States, and many of them were wives of prominent men in Liberia. Lewis was the daughter of former vice colonial agent Colston Waring, the sister of the first First Lady of the Republic, Jane Roberts, and wife of John N. Lewis, one of the signers of the Liberian Declaration of Independence. The flag they designed was adopted on 24 August 1847, about a month after Liberia had declared independence on 26 July 1847. The day the flag was adopted, the nation held a celebration in Monrovia. There, the flag was unfurled to the public for the first time, and Susannah Lewis gave a patriotic speech. The ceremony also featured speeches by a number of notable Liberian politicians and religious leaders, as well as entertainment in the form of band music.

In the 1850s and 1860s, the Eusibia N. Roye became the first Liberian owned ship to display the flag in New York City and Liverpool ports. The vessel was owned by Edward James Roye. In 1860, the Liberian flag was featured on the first known stamp to be issued by the Liberian government. On 24 October 1915, President Daniel Edward Howard signed into law an act which proclaimed 24 August as Flag Day, a national holiday.

On 22 July 1974, the Legislature of Liberia passed an act giving authorization to the president to establish a commission to give consideration to possible changes to a number of national symbols, including the flag and national anthem. The commission was headed by McKinley Alfred Deshield Sr. The commission sought to reexamine the symbols, and remove divisive aspects of them. President William Tolbert appointed 51 members to the Commission on National Unity. The commission was also called the Deshield Commission, after the man who headed it. The commission submitted their report on 24 January 1978. The report ultimately recommended no changes to the flag.

The flag is seen on many ships around the world as Liberia offers registration under its flag. Shipping companies do this to avoid taxes and restrictions that other countries enforce. As the second most popular flag of convenience (after the flag of Panama), it is estimated that 1,700 foreign-owned ships fly the Liberian flag. This brings in much of the country's revenue.

Symbolism
The eleven stripes symbolize the signatories of the Liberian Declaration of Independence and the red and white symbolize courage and moral excellence. The white star represents the first independent republic in Africa, above the blue square representing the African continent. The Liberian flag is modeled after and resembles the United States flag because Liberia was founded, colonized, established, and controlled by free people of color and formerly enslaved black people from the United States and the Caribbean with the help and support of both the United States government and the American Colonization Society (ACS), a private organization dedicated to the removal of free people of color from across North America. Some time after the African Americans began arriving in Liberia in 1822, they came to be identified as "Americo-Liberians" in an effort to separate them from native groups and enslaved Africans rescued from illegal slaving ports and ships by the U.S. Navy.

Construction
Keep the length 110 units and width as 209 units. The canton's each side is 50 units, the circumscribed square of the 5-point star has all sides 30 units and its center is 25 units from the left and upper edge of the flag of the canton/flag.

Other flags

County flags
Liberia is subdivided into 15 counties, each of which is entitled to its own flag. Each county flag bears the national flag of Liberia in the canton. The county flags are flown at regional offices and together encircling the national flag of Liberia at the Presidential Palace. 

The flags were introduced in 1965 by William Tubman for the purpose of promoting the counties as meaningful entities. Their design was inspired by Liberia's quilting tradition. 

The flags have been the subject of widespread ridicule by members of online vexillology communities on social media platforms such as Reddit and Facebook. However, vexillologist Steven A. Knowlton argues that these discussions demonstrate a lack of understanding of the political and cultural context of the flags and of the material construction of flags from textiles as opposed to digital creation.

References

External links

Flags introduced in 1847
Flags of Africa
Flag
Liberia–United States relations
Liberia